Patricia Schauss (born ) is a Swiss female former volleyball player, playing as a central. She was part of the Switzerland women's national volleyball team.

She competed at the 2013 Women's European Volleyball Championship. On club level she played for Volero Zurigo.

References

1988 births
Living people
Swiss women's volleyball players
Place of birth missing (living people)